Obscurior fragilis is a moth of the family Erebidae first described by Michael Fibiger in 2010. It is known from north-western Thailand.

The wingspan is about 10 mm. The head, patagia, anterior part of the tegulae, prothorax, basal part of the costa and costal part of the medial area are black. The costal-medial area is quadrangular. The forewing ground colour is brown, but dark brown in the subterminal and terminal areas. The crosslines are indistinct. The terminal line is marked by black interneural dots. The hindwing is grey, with a discal spot. The underside of the forewing is brown, while the underside of the hindwing is grey, with a discal spot.

References

Micronoctuini
Taxa named by Michael Fibiger
Moths described in 2010